Pat McCarthy, short for Patrick McCarthy, Patrice McCarthy or Patricia  McCarthy, may refer to:

Sports
 Pat McCarthy (Welsh footballer) (1888–?), Welsh footballer
 Pat McCarthy (cricketer) (1919–2007), cricketer for Ceylon and Western Australia
 Pat McCarthy (Gaelic footballer) (born 1950), former Gaelic footballer
 Pat McCarthy (netball) (born c. 1933), former Australia netball international

Others
 Pat McCarthy (politician), American politician from the state of Washington
 Pat McCarthy (record producer), record producer from Dublin, Ireland
 Patricia M. McCarthy (born 1962), United States judge

See also
 Patrick McCarthy (disambiguation)